Peter Sawatzky,  (1951 – ) is a Canadian sculptor from Sommerfeld, Manitoba. He is known for his large-scale work in bronze, many of animals.

Career 
Peter Sawatzky grew up on his family's farm in the Mennonite village of Sommerfeld and attended the Commercial Art Course at Red River College in Winnipeg. In 1974, Sawatzky discovered his true interest which combined his fascination for bird life and for carving. He first carved birds in basswood using the wildlife in the Spruce Woods Provincial Park in Manitoba as models. Awards and exhibitions won the artist international recognition and by the mid 80's, his success enabled him to make the decision to work in bronze and to set up his own foundry in Manitoba. In 1995, he cast a 4,000 pound bronze sculpture entitled The Passage of Time for the south side of Winnipeg's Charleswood Bridge. Notable works by Sawatzky include Seal River Crossing (2007) at Portage and Main in Winnipeg, Mother Polar Bear and Cubs (2014) at the Assiniboine Park , and a sculpture of Dirk Willems at the Mennonite Heritage Village in Steinbach, Manitoba (2018). He received the Order of Manitoba in recognition of his work in 2008.

References

1951 births
Canadian sculptors
Canadian male sculptors
Members of the Order of Manitoba
Artists from Manitoba
Canadian Mennonites
Living people
People from Pembina Valley Region, Manitoba
Mennonite artists